Ronny Van Rethy (21 November 1961) is a former Belgian footballer who mainly played as midfielder.

Honours 
Royal Antwerp

 Belgian Cup: 1991-92
 UEFA Cup Winners' Cup: 1992-93 (runners-up)

References

External links
 

Living people
1961 births
Belgian footballers
Belgium under-21 international footballers
Association football midfielders
K. Beringen F.C. players
Royal Antwerp F.C. players
K.V.C. Westerlo players
KFC Turnhout players
Belgian Pro League players